Randy C Cassingham (1959 in California, USA) is an American syndicated columnist, humorist, publisher, and speaker. He is a former member of the Society of Professional Journalists. He has been the keynote speaker at several of The Skeptics Society's annual conventions.

Cassingham is the author of the weekly syndicated news column This is True (founded 1994), which Cassingham made available by e-mail subscription to become one of the first for-profit e-mailed newsletters on the Internet. (In January 1997, an expanded paid version became one of the first paid e-mailed newsletters on the Internet.) "This is True" features several actual news items each week of unbelievable-yet-true character, with each story capped by a pithy one-liner which is "humorous, ironic or opinionated."

Cassingham is the creator of the "Get Out of Hell Free" card (his response to a This is True reader who complained that a story about Feng Shui was "anti-Christian" and told him he was going to hell), the Internet Spam Primer, and several other web sites. Cassingham also started the "HeroicStories" e-mail newsletter (founded 1999), which tells the stories of remarkable acts of kindness and courage. Management of "HeroicStories" has since been turned over to others.

Cassingham is a volunteer emergency medical First Responder for the area around his home in rural Western Colorado. He has been married to Kathryn Anne ("Kit") Riley since 2001.

Stella Awards 
Cassingham is also the Founder of the "True Stella Awards", a web site dedicated to informing the public about allegedly frivolous legal cases. The site was expanded into a 2005 book of the same name, published by Dutton, an imprint of the Penguin Group. The awards were given between 2002 and 2007 to people who filed "outrageous and frivolous lawsuits". There is also a number of false Stella Awards circulating on the Internet.

The awards were named after Stella Liebeck who, in 1992, received third degree burns to her thighs and genitals after ordering a cup of McDonald's coffee at a drive thru, putting it in between her knees while sitting in the passenger seat of her grandson's stationary car, and attempted to remove the lid in order to add cream and sugar. (The amount originally awarded by the jury was over $2.9 million but it was reduced by the judge. The final amount that she got remains unknown, since it resulted from a confidential post-trial settlement between Liebeck and McDonald's.)

In July 2012, Cassingham sent a message to the True Stella Awards mailing list, announcing that after several abortive attempts to restart the list he came to the conclusion that he had said everything about the subject of frivolous lawsuits that he had intended to say, and so was shutting down the Stella Awards.

Published work

References

External links
 Cassingham's This is True website
 Cassingham's "This is True" YouTube Channel
 "True Stella Awards" website
 "Get Out of Hell Free" website
 "Honorary Unsubscribe" website
 "Bonzer Web Sites of the Week" website
 "Cranky Customer" website
 the "Spam Primer" website
 Cassingham's Dvorak keyboard primer
 JumboJoke.com
 Groxx – a site for user submitted This is True-style stories
 the "HeroicStories" website
 Cassingham.com – Randy Cassingham's personal website
 Biography of Randy Cassingham on Cassingham.com
 Randy Cassingham's blog
 "How I Invented For Profit Email Publishing"
 "Genesis: This Just In" (a short history of This is True)
 Yahoo has stopped delivering This Is True because too many Yahoo readers have mistakenly or carelessly flagged it as spam.

American male journalists
1959 births
Living people